The Lone Deranger is the second album by Hallucinogen released in 1997 on Twisted Records. The name of the album is word play on the Lone Ranger, a fictional cowboy and hero of several eponymous radio and television series.

Track listing
"Demention"
"Snakey Shaker"
"Trancespotter"
"Horrorgram"
"Snarling (Remix)"
"Gamma Goblins Part 2"
"Deranger"
"Jiggle of the Sphinx"
"Synthesizzler" (bonus track in German release)

References

1996 albums
Hallucinogen (musician) albums